The 2003–04 New York Knicks season was the 58th season for the Knicks in the National Basketball Association (NBA). During the offseason, the Knicks signed All-Star center Dikembe Mutombo in free agency. The Knicks started the season by losing seven of their first nine games as fans at the Garden chanted "Fire Layden", in reference to general manager Scott Layden. Knicks fans would get their wish as Layden was fired and replaced by former Detroit Pistons star Isiah Thomas.

In January, the Knicks traded Antonio McDyess and Charlie Ward to the Phoenix Suns for All-Star guard Stephon Marbury and Penny Hardaway. Ward was released by the Suns, and later signed as a free agent with the San Antonio Spurs. At midseason, Thomas made more moves, trading Keith Van Horn to the Milwaukee Bucks for Tim Thomas. After a 15–24 start, the Knicks fired head coach Don Chaney, and played one game under assistant Herb Williams before signing Lenny Wilkens as their new coach. With a 39–43 record, which placed them third in the Atlantic Division, the Knicks qualified for the NBA playoffs as the seventh seed in the Eastern Conference. Allan Houston averaged 18.5 points per game, but played just 50 games due to injury.

In the first round of the playoffs, the Knicks were swept in four games by the New Jersey Nets. New York did not return to the playoffs until the 2010–11 season. Following the season, Mutombo was traded to the Chicago Bulls, who then dealt him to the Houston Rockets. Longtime Knicks play-by-play announcer Marv Albert was not retained by the MSG Network, having criticized poor play by the team on-air. He remained an NBA on TNT broadcaster until he retired from NBA broadcasting following the 2020–21 season.

NBA Draft

Roster

Regular season

Season standings

Record vs. opponents

Playoffs

|- align="center" bgcolor="#ffcccc"
| 1
| April 17
| @ New Jersey
| L 83–107
| Penny Hardaway (18)
| Stephon Marbury (5)
| Shandon Anderson (5)
| Continental Airlines Arena18,206
| 0–1
|- align="center" bgcolor="#ffcccc"
| 2
| April 20
| @ New Jersey
| L 81–99
| Stephon Marbury (23)
| Kurt Thomas (12)
| Penny Hardaway (10)
| Continental Airlines Arena19,918
| 0–2
|- align="center" bgcolor="#ffcccc"
| 3
| April 22
| New Jersey
| L 78–81
| three players tied (18)
| Kurt Thomas (12)
| Stephon Marbury (10)
| Madison Square Garden19,763
| 0–3
|- align="center" bgcolor="#ffcccc"
| 4
| April 25
| New Jersey
| L 94–100
| Stephon Marbury (31)
| Kurt Thomas (15)
| Stephon Marbury (7)
| Madison Square Garden19,763
| 0–4
|-

Player stats

Awards and records

Transactions

References

New York Knicks seasons
New York Knicks
New York Knicks
New York Knick
2000s in Manhattan
Madison Square Garden